Generation IV reactors (Gen IV) are nuclear reactor designs that are envisioned as successors of generation III reactors. The Generation IV International Forum (GIF) is an international organization that coordinates the development of generation IV reactors. 

GIF selected six reactor technologies as candidates for generation IV reactors: the gas-cooled fast reactor (GFR), the lead-cooled fast reactor (LFR), the molten salt reactor (MSR), the sodium-cooled fast reactor (SFR), the supercritical-water-cooled reactor (SCWR) and the very high-temperature reactor (VHTR). The designs target improved safety, sustainability, efficiency, and cost. The first commercial plants are not expected before 2040–2050, although the World Nuclear Association in 2015 suggested that some might enter commercial operation before 2030. 

The most developed Gen IV reactor design is the sodium fast reactor. It has received the greatest share of funding that supports demonstration facilities. Moir and Teller consider the molten-salt reactor, a less developed technology, as potentially having the greatest inherent safety of the six models.

The very-high-temperature reactor designs operate at much higher temperatures than prior generations. This allows for high temperature electrolysis or for sulfur–iodine cycle for the efficient production of hydrogen and the synthesis of carbon-neutral fuels.

The majority of reactors in operation around the world are second generation and third generation reactor systems, as the majority of the first generation systems have been retired. No Generation IV reactors were in operation as of February 2023. Generation V reactors are purely theoretical and are not yet considered feasible.

Generation IV International Forum 

The Generation IV International Forum (GIF) is an international organization with as stated goal "the development of concepts for one or more Generation IV systems that can be licensed, constructed, and operated in a manner that will provide a competitively priced and reliable supply of energy ... while satisfactorily addressing nuclear safety, waste, proliferation and public perception concerns." It coordinates the development of GEN IV technologies.

The Forum was initiated in January 2000 by the Office of Nuclear Energy of the U.S. Department of Energy’s (DOE) "as a co-operative international endeavour seeking to develop the research necessary to test the feasibility and performance of fourth generation nuclear systems, and to make them available for industrial deployment by 2030." It was established in 2001, iaming at availability for industrial deployment by 2030. 

As of 2021, active members include: Australia, Canada, China, the European Atomic Energy Community (Euratom), France, Japan, Russia, South Africa, South Korea, Switzerland, the United Kingdom and the United States. The non-active members are Argentina and Brazil.  

The 36th GIF meeting in Brussels was held in November 2013. A brief overview of the reactor designs and activities by each forum member has been made available. An update of the technology roadmap which details R&D objectives for the next decade was published in January 2014.

Timelines 
The GIF Forum introduced timelines for each of the six systems. Research and development divide into three phases:
 Viability: test basic concepts under relevant conditions; identify and resolve all "potential technical show-stoppers";
 Performance: verify and optimise "engineering-scale processes, phenomena and materials capabilities" under prototypical conditions;
 Demonstration: complete and license the detailed design and carry out construction and operation of prototype or demonstration systems.

In 2000, GIF stated, "After the performance phase is complete for each system, at least six years and several US$ billion will be required for detailed design and construction of a demonstration system." In the Roadmap update of 2013, the performance and demonstration phases were considerably shifted to later dates, while no targets for the commercialisation phases are set. According to the GIF, "It will take at least two or three decades before the deployment of commercial Gen IV systems."

Reactor types 
Many reactor types were considered initially; the list was then refined to focus on the most promising technologies. Three systems are nominally thermal reactors and four are fast reactors. The Very High Temperature Reactor (VHTR) potentially can provide high quality process heat. Fast reactors offer the possibility of burning actinides to further reduce waste and can breed more fuel than they consume. These systems offer significant advances in sustainability, safety and reliability, economics, proliferation resistance (depending on perspective) and physical protection.

Thermal reactors 
A thermal reactor is a nuclear reactor that uses slow or thermal neutrons. A neutron moderator is used to slow the neutrons emitted by fission to make them more likely to be captured by the fuel.

High-temperature gas-cooled reactor (HTGR) 
A high temperature gas-cooled reactor (HTGR) typically operates at temperatures two or three times those of conventional reactors. It is graphite-moderated and typically uses helium cooling. It offers lower power density. The concept originated in the 1940s and has only begun to mature.

HTGR runs on TRi-structural ISOtropic (TRISO) particle fuel. It is made of individual particles Instead of rods. TRISO consists of uranium, carbon, and oxygen sealed in three layers of carbon or ceramics materials to stabilize the eventual waste products.

These particles are formed into stable cylindrical pellets or billiard-ball-sized spheres called "pebbles." It is more resistant to neutrons, corrosion, oxidation, and high temperatures than conventional fuels. These pebbles do not melt in the reactor, which can run at higher temperatures. The fuel gradually proceeds through the reactor,. Spent pebbles exit the bottom of the reactor while fresh pebbles replace them at the top.

In 2012, as part of its next generation nuclear plant competition, Idaho National Laboratory approved a design similar to Areva's prismatic block Antares reactor to be deployed as a prototype by 2021.

The Chinese government began construction of a demonstration HTR-PM 200-MW high temperature pebble bed reactor in 2012 as a successor to its HTR-10.

Very-high-temperature reactor (VHTR) 

The very-high-temperature reactor (VHTR) uses a graphite-moderated core with a once-through uranium fuel cycle, using helium or molten salt. This reactor design envisions an outlet temperature of 1,000°C. The reactor core can be either a prismatic-block or a pebble bed reactor design. The high temperatures enable applications such as process heat or hydrogen production via the thermochemical sulfur-iodine cycle process.

In January 2016, X-energy was provided a five-year grant of up to $40 million by the United States Department of Energy to advance their reactor development. The Xe-100 is a PBMR that would generate 80 MWe, or 320 MWe in a 'four-pack'.

Molten-salt reactor (MSR) 

A molten salt reactor (MSR) is a type of reactor where the primary coolant or the fuel itself is a molten salt mixture. It operates at high temperature and low pressure.  

Molten salt can be used for thermal, epithermal and fast reactors. Since 2005 the focus has been on fast spectrum MSRs (MSFR).

Other designs include integral molten salt reactors (e.g. IMSR) and molten chloride salt fast reactors (MCSFR). 

Early thermal spectrum concepts and many current ones rely on uranium tetrafluoride (UF4) or thorium tetrafluoride (ThF4), dissolved in molten fluoride salt. The fluid reaches criticality by flowing into a core with a graphite moderator. The fuel may be dispersed in a graphite matrix. These designs are more accurately termed an epithermal reactor than a thermal reactor due to the higher average speed of the neutrons that cause the fission events.

MCSFR does away with the graphite moderator. They achieve criticality using a sufficient volume of salt and fissile material. They can consume much more of the fuel and leave only short-lived waste. 

Most MSR designs are derived from the 1960s Molten-Salt Reactor Experiment (MSRE). Variants include the conceptual Dual fluid reactor that uses lead as a cooling medium with molten salt fuel, commonly a metal chloride, e.g. plutonium(III) chloride, to aid in greater closed-fuel cycle capabilities. Other notable approaches include the Stable Salt Reactor (SSR) concept, which encases the molten salt in the well-established fuel rods of conventional reactors. This latter design was found to be the most competitive by consultancy firm Energy Process Development in 2015.

Another design under development is TerraPower's Molten Chloride Fast Reactor. This concept mixes the liquid natural uranium and molten chloride coolant in the reactor core, reaching very high temperatures at atmospheric pressure.

Another notable feature of the MSR is the possibility of a thermal spectrum nuclear waste-burner. Conventionally only fast spectrum reactors have been considered viable for utilization or reduction of the spent nuclear fuel. Thermal waste-burning was achieved by replacing a fraction of the uranium in the spent nuclear fuel with thorium. The net production rate of transuranic elements (e.g. plutonium and americium) is below the consumption rate, thus reducing the nuclear storage problem, without the nuclear proliferation concerns and other technical issues associated with a fast reactor.

Supercritical-water-cooled reactor (SCWR) 

The supercritical water reactor (SCWR) is a reduced moderation water reactor concept. Because the average speed of the fission-causing neutrons within the fuel is faster than thermal neutrons, it is more accurately termed an epithermal reactor than a thermal reactor. It uses supercritical water as the working fluid. SCWRs are basically light water reactors (LWR) operating at higher pressure and temperatures with a direct, once-through heat exchange cycle. As commonly envisioned, it would operate on a direct cycle, much like a boiling water reactor (BWR). Since it uses supercritical water (not to be confused with critical mass) as the working fluid, it would have only one water phase. This makes the heat exchange method more similar to a pressurized water reactor (PWR). It could operate at much higher temperatures than both current PWRs and BWRs.

Supercritical water-cooled reactors (SCWRs) offer high thermal efficiency (i.e., about 45% vs. about 33% efficiency for current LWRs) and considerable simplification.

The mission of the SCWR is generation of low-cost electricity. It is built upon two proven technologies, LWRs, the most commonly deployed power generating reactors, and superheated fossil fuel fired boilers, also in wide use. 32 organizations in 13 countries are investigating the concept.

SCWRs share the steam explosion and radioactive steam release hazards of BWRs and LWRs as well as the need for extremely expensive heavy duty pressure vessels, pipes, valves, and pumps. These shared problems are inherently more severe for SCWRs due to their higher temperatures.

One SCWR design under development is the VVER-1700/393 (VVER-SCWR or VVER-SKD) – a Russian SCWR with double-inlet-core and a breeding ratio of 0.95.

Fast reactors 
A fast reactor directly uses fission neutrons without moderation. Fast reactors can be configured to "burn", or fission, all actinides, and given enough time, therefore drastically reduce the actinides fraction in spent nuclear fuel produced by the present world fleet of thermal neutron light water reactors, thus closing the fuel cycle. Alternatively, if configured differently, they can breed more actinide fuel than they consume.

Gas-cooled fast reactor (GFR) 

The gas-cooled fast reactor (GFR) features a fast-neutron spectrum and closed fuel cycle. The reactor is helium-cooled. Its outlet temperature is 850 °C. It moves the very-high-temperature reactor (VHTR) to a more sustainable fuel cycle. It uses a direct Brayton cycle gas turbine for high thermal efficiency. Several fuel forms are under consideration: composite ceramic fuel, advanced fuel particles, or ceramic-clad actinide compounds. Core configurations involve pin- or plate-based fuel assemblies or prismatic blocks.

The European Sustainable Nuclear Industrial Initiative provided funding for three Generation IV reactor systems: 

 Allegro: a 100 MWt gas-cooled fast reactor, planned for central or eastern Europe. The central European Visegrád Group are pursuing the technology. 
 GoFastR: In 2013 German, British, and French institutes finished a 3-year collaboration study on the follow-on industrial scale design. They were funded by the EU's 7th FWP framework programme, with the goal of making a sustainable VHTR.

Sodium-cooled fast reactor (SFR) 

Sodium-cooled fast reactors (SCFRs) have been operated in multiple countries since the 1980s.

The two largest experimental sodium cooled fast reactors are in Russia, the BN-600 and the BN-800 (880 MWe gross). These NPPs are being used to provide operating experience and technological solutions that will be applied to the construction of the BN-1200 (OKBM Afrikantov first Gen IV reactor). The largest ever operated was the French Superphenix reactor at over 1200 MWe, successfully operating before decommissioning in 1996. In India, the Fast Breeder Test Reactor (FBTR) reached criticality in October 1985. In September 2002, fuel burn up efficiency in the FBTR for the first time reached the 100,000 megawatt-days per metric ton uranium (MWd/MTU) mark. This is considered an important milestone in Indian breeder reactor technology. Using that experience, the Prototype Fast Breeder Reactor, a 500 MWe Sodium cooled fast reactor is being built at a cost of INR 5,677 crores (~US$900 million). After numerous delays, the government reported in March 2020 that the reactor might be operational in December 2021. The PFBR was to be followed by six more Commercial Fast Breeder Reactors (CFBRs) of 600 MWe each.

The Gen IV SFR is a project that builds on the oxide fueled fast breeder reactor and the metal fueled integral fast reactor. Its goals are to increase the efficiency of uranium usage by breeding plutonium and eliminating transuranic isotopes. The reactor design uses an unmoderated core running on fast neutrons, designed to allow any transuranic isotope to be consumed (and in some cases used as fuel). SFR fuel expands when the reactor overheats, automatically slowing down the chain reaction, making it passively safe.

One SFR reactor concept is cooled by liquid sodium and fueled by a metallic alloy of uranium and plutonium or spent nuclear fuel, the "nuclear waste" of light water reactors. The SFR fuel is contained in steel cladding. Liquid sodium fills the space between the clad elements that make up the fuel assembly. One of the design challenges is the risks of handling sodium, which reacts explosively if it comes into contact with water. The use of liquid metal instead of water as coolant allows the system to work at atmospheric pressure, reducing the risk of leakage.

The European Sustainable Nuclear Industrial Initiative funded three Generation IV reactor systems. Advanced Sodium Technical Reactor for Industrial Demonstration (ASTRID) was a sodium-cooled fast reactor, that was cancelled in August 2019.

Numerous progenitors of the Gen IV SFR exist, such as the 400 MWe Fast Flux Test Facility operated for ten years at Hanford.

The 20 MWe EBR II operated for over thirty years at Idaho National Laboratory, and was shut down in 1994.

GE Hitachi's PRISM reactor is a modernized and commercial implementation of the Integral Fast Reactor (IFR), developed by Argonne National Laboratory between 1984 and 1994. The primary purpose of PRISM is burning up spent nuclear fuel from other reactors, rather than breeding new fuel. The design reduces the half lives of the fissionable elements present in spent nuclear fuel while generating electricity largely as a byproduct.

Lead-cooled fast reactor 

The lead-cooled fast reactor (LFR) features a fast-neutron-spectrum lead or lead/bismuth eutectic (LBE) coolant with a closed fuel cycle. Proposals include a small 50 to 150 MWe that features a long refueling interval, a modular system rated at 300 to 400 MWe, and a large monolithic plant at 1,200 MWe. The fuel is metal or nitride-based containing fertile uranium and transuranics. The reactor is cooled by natural convection with a reactor outlet coolant temperature of 550-800 °C. The higher temperature enables the production of hydrogen by thermochemical processes.

The European Sustainable Nuclear Industrial Initiative is funding a 100 MWt LFR, an accelerator-driven sub-critical reactor called MYRRHA. It is to be built in Belgium with construction expected by 2036. A reduced-power model called Guinevere was started up at Mol in March 2009 and became operational in 2012.

Two other lead-cooled fast reactors under development are the SVBR-100, a modular 100 MWe lead-bismuth cooled fast neutron reactor concept designed by OKB Gidropress in Russia and the BREST-OD-300 (Lead-cooled fast reactor) 300 MWe, to be developed after the SVBR-100, it will dispense with the fertile blanket around the core and will supersede the sodium cooled BN-600 reactor design, to purportedly give enhanced proliferation resistance. Preparatory construction work commenced in May 2020.

Assessment 
The GEN IV Forum reframes the reactor safety paradigm from accepting that nuclear accidents can occur and should be mastered to eliminating the possibility of an accident. Active and passive safety systems would be at least as effective as those of Generation III systems and render the most severe accidents physically impossible. 

Relative to Gen II-III, Gen IV reactors include:
 Nuclear waste that remains radioactive for a few centuries instead of millennia
 100–300x energy yield from the same amount of nuclear fuel
 Broader range of fuels, including unencapsulated raw fuels (non-pebble MSR, LFTR).
 Potential to burn existing nuclear waste and produce electricity: a closed fuel cycle. 
 Improved safety via features such as ambient pressure operation, automatic passive reactor shutdown, and alternate coolants.

A specific risk of the SFR is related to using metallic sodium as a coolant. In case of a breach, sodium explosively reacts with water. Argon is used to prevent sodium oxidation. Argon can displace oxygen in the air and can pose hypoxia concerns for workers. This was a factor at the loop type Prototype Fast Breeder Reactor Monju at Tsuruga, Japan. Using lead or molten salt coolants mitigates this problem as they are less reactive and have a high freezing temperature and ambient pressure. Lead has much higher viscosity, much higher density, lower heat capacity, and more radioactive neutron activation products than sodium.

Multiple proof of concept Gen IV designs have been built. For example, the reactors at Fort St. Vrain Generating Station and HTR-10 are similar to the proposed Gen IV VHTR designs, and the pool type EBR-II, Phénix, BN-600 and BN-800 reactor are similar to the proposed pool type Gen IV SFR designs.

Nuclear engineer David Lochbaum cautions, "the problem with new reactors and accidents is twofold: scenarios arise that are impossible to plan for in simulations; and humans make mistakes". As one director of a U.S. research laboratory put it, "fabrication, construction, operation, and maintenance of new reactors will face a steep learning curve: advanced technologies will have a heightened risk of accidents and mistakes. The technology may be proven, but people are not".

Design projects

See also 

 List of small modular reactor designs
 Nuclear reactor
 Nuclear material
 Nuclear physics
 List of reactor types
 Generation II reactor
 Generation III reactor
 Integral Fast Reactor
 Liquid fluoride thorium reactor
 Breeder reactor
 Small modular reactor
 List of nuclear reactors

References

External links 
 Article from Idaho National Laboratory detailing some current efforts at developing Gen. IV reactors.
 Generation IV International Forum (GIF)
 U.S. Department of Energy Office of Nuclear Energy, Science and Technology
 Gen IV presentation
 Science or Fiction - Is there a Future for Nuclear? (Nov. 2007) - A publication from the Austrian Ecology Institute about 'Generation IV' and Fusion reactors.
  "In the wake of a severe plant accident, advanced reactor designs are getting renewed attention."
 International Thorium Energy Organisation - www.IThEO.org
 International Thorium Energy Committee - iThEC

Nuclear power reactor types
Idaho National Laboratory